The Hoher Riffler is  high and is the tallest mountain in the Verwall Alps, a mountain range in Central Eastern Alps. It is situated in the West of the Austrian state of Tyrol.

References 

Mountains of Tyrol (state)
Mountains of the Alps
Verwall Alps
Alpine three-thousanders